John Colarusso is a linguist specializing in Caucasian languages. Since 1976, he has taught at McMaster University in Hamilton, Ontario.

Colarusso has published more than sixty-five articles on linguistics, myths, politics, and the Caucasus; he has also authored three books, edited one, and is finishing two further books.

Among other works, he has published grammar books of the Kabardian language.

Selected publications 
 
 
 Colarusso, John (1997). "Phyletic Links between Proto-Indo-European and Proto–Northwest Caucasian". The Journal of Indo-European Studies (Chicago Linguistic Society) 25 (1–2): 119–151.
 
 Colarusso, John (2003). "Further Etymologies between Indo-European and Northwest Caucasian". In Holisky, Dee Ann; Tuite, Kevin. Current Issues in Linguistic Theory. Amsterdam: John Benjamins Publishing Company. pp. 41–60. .
 Colarusso, John (2014). The Northwest Caucasian Languages (RLE Linguistics F: World Linguistics): A Phonological Survey (Routledge Library Editions: Linguistics) Kindle Edition

Footnotes 

Linguists from Canada
Living people
Year of birth missing (living people)
Academic staff of McMaster University
Indo-Europeanists
Linguists of Indo-European languages
Linguists of Caucasian languages
Linguists of Northwest Caucasian languages
Kabardian language
Paleolinguists
Historical linguists